Monguno attack may refer to:

June 2015 Monguno bombing
September 2015 Borno State bombings
2020 Monguno and Nganzai massacres